Parliamentary elections were held in Norway on 8 and 9 September 1985. The Labour Party remained the largest party in the Storting, winning 71 of the 157 seats. It was the first election since 1885  in which the Liberal Party failed to win a seat.

Results

Seat distribution

References

General elections in Norway
1980s elections in Norway
Norway
Parliamentary
Norway